Dry Brook is a tributary of the Paulins Kill in Frankford Township and Branchville Borough in Sussex County in northwestern New Jersey, United States.  Its waters combine with the Culver Brook or West Branch of the Paulins Kill with the river's East Branch near the unincorporated hamlet Augusta near Branchville.

See also
List of rivers of New Jersey

Rivers of Sussex County, New Jersey
Paulins Kill watershed
Rivers of New Jersey